is a Japanese manga written and illustrated by Tenten Hosokawa. It was adapted into a live-action television series in 2009 and a live-action film in 2011.

Cast
Norika Fujiwara (TV series), Aoi Miyazaki (film)
Taizo Harada (TV series), Masato Sakai (film)

Film 2011 cast
 Aoi Miyazaki as Haruko Takasaki
 Masato Sakai as Mikio Takasaki
 Hiroshi Inuzuka as Kawaji
 Kanji Tsuda as Kazuo Takasaki
 Ren Osugi as Yasuo Kurita

References

External links
Official website of the TV series 
 

2006 manga
Live-action films based on manga
Manga adapted into films
Films directed by Kiyoshi Sasabe
Japanese drama films